USS El Paso has been the name of two ships in the United States Navy.  Both are named for the city of El Paso, Texas.

 , a  commissioned in 1943 and decommissioned in 1946.

United States Navy ship names